An ice storm impacted the Southern United States in early 2023, bringing heavy snow and ice across the region. At least 10 deaths have been attributed to the winter storm, which was unofficially named Winter Storm Mara by The Weather Channel.

History 
The winter storm started when an Arctic cold passage made its way south into the Southern United States, where it met with warm and moist air from the Gulf of Mexico, creating the ice storm.

On January 31, an inch of sleet fell in the Tulsa, Oklahoma area, with the accompaniment of lightning at times. On the same day, freezing rain also fell in Arkansas, including the Fayetteville and Fort Smith areas, as well as Missouri, where cities such as Joplin and Springfield were impacted. Freezing rain and sleet fell as far south as Austin and San Antonio on January 31.

Preparations 

Arkansas Governor Sarah Huckabee Sanders stated that she activated winter weather support teams from the Arkansas National Guard. Multiple schools and universities, including Texas State University and St. Edward's University, announced virtual learning and closures. DoorDash suspended operations in central Arkansas on January 31, while USPS also suspended operations in north Texas on that same day. Other companies, including Amazon, FedEx, and UPS were operating under a limited capacity. 60 warming shelters were opened in Texas. The funeral for Tyre Nichols was postponed for four hours. A NBA game between the Detroit Pistons and the Washington Wizards was postponed. At least more than 60 million people from New Mexico to West Virginia were under a winter weather alert.

Impact 
Ten deaths have been attributed to the winter storm, including seven in Texas, two in Oklahoma, and one in Arkansas. Numerous interstates, including interstates 10, 30, 35W, and 40 were shut down due to car accidents that were caused by the winter storm. Additionally, at least 100 car accidents were reported as a result.

In Texas, at least 350,000 people were left without power as a result of the storm due to tree limbs and power lines being brought down to ice. Of those 350,000 people, 160,000 were in Austin. This can be contrasted with Winter Storm Uri, wherein 4.5 million people were left without power due to, among other things, demand exceeding supply. On February 4, Governor Greg Abbott of Texas issued a disaster declaration for a seven county area.

At least 1,600 flights have been canceled, 888 of them in Dallas Fort Worth International Airport, cancelled flights included flights from Delta, United, Southwest, and American airlines. At least 530,000 power outages were also reported.

See also 
 February 2023 North American cold wave

References 

2023 disasters in the United States
2023 in Texas
2023 meteorology
Disasters in Texas
Ice storms
January 2023 events in the United States
February 2023 events in the United States